Jim Geraghty is the senior political correspondent of National Review and author of several books. In addition to writing  for National Review, Geraghty blogs for National Review Online and is a former reporter for States News Service.

Career
During the 2004 U.S. presidential election, Geraghty was often critical of Democratic Party presidential candidate John Kerry. At the time his weblog used the name "The Kerry Spot". It was later renamed "TKS".
Geraghty reported on the Killian documents and Rathergate stories on a daily basis on behalf of National Review and was critical of CBS and Dan Rather. Geraghty was one of the self described Pajamahadeen.

Starting in March 2005, Geraghty posted to TKS from Turkey, where he lived as an expatriate. In January 2007, he moved from TKS to a new blog, originally named "The Hillary Spot", but since renamed to "The Campaign Spot".

Geraghty's first book, Voting to Kill: How 9/11 Launched the Era of Republican Leadership (Touchstone) was published in 2006. He wrote the novel The Weed Agency, published by Crown Forum in June 2014, and coauthored Heavy Lifting with Cam Edwards, published by Regnery in October 2015.

In November 2022, he argued in the Washington Post that Florida's governor, Ron DeSantis, "would represent a return to normality" if elected U.S. president in 2024.

References

External links

 Archive of Geraghty's articles for National Review
 TKS archives
 The Campaign Spot
 Geraghty on Mary Mapes' book Truth and Duty November 2, 2005
 
 Jim Geraghty - Senior Political Correspondent - National Review from LinkedIn 

Year of birth missing (living people)
Living people
American male bloggers
American bloggers
American expatriates in Turkey
American male journalists
American political writers
American reporters and correspondents
21st-century American non-fiction writers